Salman Amin "Sal" Khan (born October 11, 1976) is an American educator and the founder of Khan Academy, a free online non-profit educational platform and an organization with which he has produced over 6,500 video lessons teaching a wide spectrum of academic subjects, originally focusing on mathematics and science. He is also the founder of Khan Lab School, a brick-and-mortar private school in Mountain View, California.

, the Khan Academy channel on YouTube has 7.7 million subscribers, and its videos have been viewed more than 2 billion times. In 2012, Time named Khan in its annual list of the 100 most influential people in the world. In the same year, Forbes magazine featured Khan on its cover, with the story "$1 Trillion Opportunity."

Early life and family 
Salman Amin Khan was born on October 11, 1976 to Bengali Muslim parents Fakhrul Amin Khan (d. 1990) and Masuda Khan in Metairie, Louisiana. His father was a physician, and originally hailed from the village of Rahmatpur in Babuganj, Barisal District, Bangladesh. They are descended from Rahmat Khan, a Pathan chieftain who was killed in conflict with Raja Kandarpanarayan Rai of Chandradwip in the 16th century. Khan's grandfather, Abdul Wahab Khan was the 3rd Speaker of the National Assembly of Pakistan. His mother, Masuda Khan, is from Murshidabad in West Bengal, India.

Education 
He attended Grace King High School, where, as he recalls, "a few classmates were fresh out of jail and others were bound for top universities." He was a cartoonist for the high school's newspaper. Khan took upper-level mathematics courses at the University of New Orleans while he was in high school and graduated as valedictorian in 1994.

He attended the Massachusetts Institute of Technology (MIT), graduating with Bachelor of Science and Master of Science degrees in Course 6 (electrical engineering and computer science), and another bachelor's degree in Course 18 (mathematics), in 1998. In his final year, Khan was the president of the "Senior Gift Committee," a philanthropy program of the graduating class.

Khan also holds a Master of Business Administration from Harvard Business School.

Career 
In 2002, Khan was a summertime intern at PARC. From 2003 to late 2009, he worked as a hedge fund analyst at Connective Capital Management.

Khan Academy 

In 2004, Khan began tutoring his cousin, Nadia, in mathematics over the internet using Yahoo!'s Doodle notepad. When other relatives and friends sought his tutoring, he moved his tutorials to YouTube, where he created an account on November 16, 2006.

The popularity of his educational videos on the video-sharing website prompted Khan to quit his job as a financial analyst in late 2009. He moved his focus to developing his YouTube channel, Khan Academy, full-time with the aid of close friend Josh Gefner. Khan subsequently received sponsorship from Ann Doerr, the wife of John Doerr.

His videos received worldwide interest from both students and non-students, with more than 458 million views in the first number of years.

Khan outlined his mission as to "accelerate learning for students of all ages. With this in mind, we want to share our content with whoever may find it useful." Khan plans to extend the "free school" to cover topics such as English literature.

Khan published a book about Khan Academy and education goals titled The One World Schoolhouse: Education Reimagined.

Khan Academy, initially a tool for students, added the Coach feature in 2012, promoting the connection of teachers with students through videos and monitor tools. In 2012, Khan received the American Academy of Achievement’s Gold Medal. In 2014, Khan received the 19th Annual Heinz Award in the Human Condition category.

In 2015, Khan announced that Khan Academy was partnering with the College Board to create free practice resources for the SAT test.

Khan believes that supplementing traditional classroom education with the technology being developed by his Academy can improve the effectiveness of teachers by freeing them from traditional lectures and giving them more time for instruction specific to individual students' needs.

Stanford AI researcher Andrew Ng has named Khan as a huge inspiration for the founding of Coursera, one of the first massive open online course (MOOC) platforms.

Khan Lab School 
Khan's pedagogical idea is that students learn better when they can manage the process of acquiring knowledge independently and at their own pace. They should then work in teams to apply the knowledge they have learned. This concept is known as flipped classroom. His approach to learning incorporates elements of Benjamin Bloom's Mastery Learning. This Personalized Learning method is tested at his Khan Lab School, founded in 2014.

Schoolhouse.world 
In early 2020 during the COVID-19 pandemic, Khan launched Schoolhouse: a free non-profit initiative to provide small-group tutoring for students worldwide through Zoom meetings.

Schoolhouse certifications, developed in partnership with the University of Chicago, test students’ mastery of subjects and certify their knowledge. MIT and Case Western Reserve University have since signed on.

Awards 
In 2016, Khan received the fourth-highest civilian award of the Republic of India, the Padma Shri, from the President of India.
On May 27, 2021, Khan received an honorary Doctor of Laws degree from Harvard University.

Personal life 
Khan is married to a Pakistani physician, Umaima Marvi. The couple live with their children in Mountain View, California.

Khan has said about his beliefs:
"If you believe in trying to make the best of the finite number of years we have on this planet (while not making it any worse for anyone else), think that pride and self-righteousness are the cause of most conflict and negativity, and are humbled by the vastness and mystery of the Universe, then I'm the same religion as you."

References

External links 

 
 

1976 births
American chief executives of education-related organizations
Mathematics popularizers
American financial analysts
American hedge fund managers
American nonprofit businesspeople
American people of Bangladeshi descent
Bangladeshi people of Afghan descent
American technology chief executives
American technology company founders
Businesspeople from New Orleans
Businesspeople from the San Francisco Bay Area
Grace King High School alumni
Harvard Business School alumni
Living people
MIT School of Engineering alumni
People from Mountain View, California
People from Metairie, Louisiana
American YouTubers
Recipients of the Padma Shri in literature & education
Asia Game Changer Award winners
Educators from Louisiana
People from Barisal District
21st-century American businesspeople
20th-century Bengalis
21st-century Bengalis
American Muslims